Saran may refer to:

Places 
 Saran, Loiret, a commune of the Loiret Department, France
 Saran, Kazakhstan, a city in Kazakhstan
 Saran district, Bihar, India
 Saran division, Bihar, India
 Saran (Lok Sabha constituency), Bihar, India
 Saran, Iran (disambiguation), places in Iran
 Sárán, the Hungarian name for Şerani village, Borod Commune, Bihor County, Romania
 Saransk, Russia

People 
 Saran (director), Indian film director
 Saran, a legendary King of Ulster
 Saran (name)

Other uses 
 Saran (plastic), the brand name of a polyethylene food wrap, that was once made from polyvinylidene chloride

See also
 
 Sarran
 Saren (disambiguation)
 Sarin (disambiguation)
 Saron (disambiguation)